A Perfect Day is the eighth studio album by Singaporean singer Stefanie Sun, released on 7 October 2005 by Warner Music Taiwan. The album earned an IFPI Hong Kong Top Sales Music Award for Top 10 Best Selling Mandarin Albums of the Year in 2005.

Track listing
 "完美的一天" (A Perfect Day)
 "眼淚成詩" (Poems & Tears)
 "隐形人" (Invisible)
 "流浪地圖" (Wandermap)
 "第一天" (First Day)
 "Honey Honey"
 "心願" (Wish)
 "另一張臉" (Another Face)
 "夢不落" (Flying With Dreams)
 "明天晴天" (Sunny Day Tomorrow)

References

2005 albums
Stefanie Sun albums
Warner Music Taiwan albums